Latvia competed at the 2014 Winter Olympics in Sochi, Russia, from 7 to 23 February 2014. The Latvian team consisted of 58 athletes in nine sports. These were the third consecutive games the country qualified to send 58 athletes.

Ice hockey player Vitalijs Pavlovs tested positive for methylhexaneamine and was thrown out of the Olympics.

Latvia originally won two silver medals and two bronze medals. In November 2017, the Russian Bobsleigh teams that came first and fourth in the four-man event, was disqualified. In addition, the Russian Bobsleigh teams that came first and fourth in the two-man event, was also disqualified. This meant Latvia moved from the original 5th place to the bronze medal position in the two-man event and from the original silver medal to the gold medal position in the four-man event respectively. The IOC requested that the FIBT modify the results, and the medals were redistributed accordingly. Also, the gold medal in the four-man Bobsleigh event is Latvia's first Winter Olympic gold medal.

Medalists

Alpine skiing 

According to the final quota allocation released on 20 January 2014, Latvia had five athletes in qualification position.

Biathlon 

Based on their performance at the 2012 and 2013 Biathlon World Championships, Latvia qualified 1 man and 1 woman.

Bobsleigh

The team consisted of the following athletes:

* – Denotes the driver of each sled

Cross-country skiing 

According to the final quota allocation released on 20 January 2014, Latvia had three athletes in qualification position.

Distance

Sprint

Ice hockey 

Latvia qualified a men's team by winning a qualification tournament.

Group stage

Qualification playoff

Quarterfinal

Luge 

Latvia achieved the following quota places:

Men

Women

Mixed team relay

Short track speed skating 

Men

Qualification legend: ADV – Advanced due to being impeded by another skater; FA – Qualify to medal round; FB – Qualify to consolation round

Skeleton 

Latvia had three athletes in qualification positions.

Speed skating 

Men

References

External links 

Latvia at the 2014 Winter Olympics

Nations at the 2014 Winter Olympics
2014
Winter Olympics